Qotrom (also Romanized as Qoţrom) is a village in Mobarakeh Rural District, in the Central District of Bafq County, Yazd Province, Iran. At the 2006 census, its population was 55, in 29 families.

References 

Populated places in Bafq County